The 1967 San Francisco State Gators football team represented San Francisco State College—now known as San Francisco State University—as a member of the Far Western Conference (FWC) during the 1967 NCAA College Division football season. Led by seventh-year head coach Vic Rowen, San Francisco State compiled an overall record of 9–2 with a mark of 6–0 in conference play, winning the FWC for the fifth time in seven years. For the season the team outscored its opponents 235 to 134. The Gators played home games at Cox Stadium in San Francisco.

San Francisco State was invited to Camellia Bowl, the western regional final for the NCAA College Division, played in Sacramento, California. The Gators lost the game to No. 1-ranked San Diego State, 27–6.

Schedule

Team players in the NFL
The following San Francisco State players were selected in the 1968 NFL Draft.

References

San Francisco State
San Francisco State Gators football seasons
Northern California Athletic Conference football champion seasons
San Francisco State Gators football